Farah Airport  is located in the eastern section of Farah in Afghanistan, which is the capital city of Farah Province. The airport is under the Ministry of Transport and Civil Aviation (MoTCA), and serves the population of southwestern Afghanistan. It currently provides domestic flight services to several cities but may include international flights sometime in the future.

Farah Airport was used for military purposes in the past by the United States Armed Forces and the International Security Assistance Force (ISAF), including the Afghan Air Force (AAF). It was renovated and expanded recently, with new facilities added for the Afghan National Security Forces (ANSF).

Airlines and destinations

See also
List of airports in Afghanistan

References

External links 
 (a documentary on the airport by ASR TV, July 1, 2019)
 Airport record for Farah Airport at Landings.com.
 
 
 

Airports in Afghanistan
Farah Province